Pygmalion and Galatea is an 1890 painting by the French artist Jean-Léon Gérôme. The motif is taken from Ovid's Metamorphoses and depicts the sculptor Pygmalion kissing his statue Galatea at the moment the goddess Aphrodite brings her to life.

Multiple versions
Jean-Léon Gérôme painted Pygmalion and Galatea in the summer of 1890. In 1891 he made a marble sculpture of the same subject, possibly based on a plaster version also used as model for the painting. He made several alternative versions of the painting, each presenting the subject from a different angle; the Metropolitan Museum of Art page provides a detailed history and extensive references. Different versions of the painting are seen in the backgrounds of the self-portraits The Artist and His Model (now at the Haggin Museum) and Working in Marble (Dahesh Museum of Art), in which Gérôme depicts himself sculpting Tanagra, made the same year that he painted Pygmalion and Galatea.

Provenance
The most famous version, where Galatea is seen from behind, was bought by Boussod, Valadon & Cie on 22 March 1892, who sold it on April 7, for 17,250 FFR, to Charles T. Yerkes. After his death it was sold several times until it was donated to the Metropolitan Museum of Art by Louis C. Raegner in 1927. The other versions are in private collections or lost.

Gallery

See also
Tanagra (Gérôme sculpture)

References

1890 paintings
Paintings by Jean-Léon Gérôme
Paintings depicting Greek myths
Paintings depicting Roman myths
Paintings in the collection of the Metropolitan Museum of Art
Works based on Pygmalion from Ovid's Metamorphoses
Paintings about sculpture
Paintings of Cupid
Paintings based on Metamorphoses